This is a list of  Brazilian journalists, those born in Brazil and who have established citizenship or residency.

 Ana Maria Bahiana
 Ana Maria Braga
 Ana Maria Machado
 Ana Paula Araújo
 Ana Paula Padrão
 Andrei Netto
 Adalgisa Nery
 Adísia Sá
 Alberto Dines
 Alceu Amoroso Lima
 Artur da Távola
 Assis Chateaubriand
 Austregésilo de Athayde
 Bernardo Carvalho
 Boris Casoy
 Carlos Lacerda
 Carlos Nascimento
 Cid Moreira
 Cláudio Abramo
 Clóvis Beviláqua
 Carlos Heitor Cony
 Ciro Pessoa
 Cornélio Pires
 Claudio Tognolli
 Chico Pinheiro
 Cristiana Lôbo
 Coelho Neto
 Dulce Damasceno de Brito 
 Edgard Leuenroth
 Edinaldo Filgueira
 Elio Gaspari
 Elsie Lessa
 Eric Filardi
 Ethevaldo Mello de Siqueira
 Fátima Bernardes
 Fausto Silva
 Francisco de Sales Torres Homem
 Franklin Távora
 Gilberto Dimenstein
 Glória Maria
 Gustavo Barroso
 Heraldo Pereira
 João do Rio
 José-Itamar de Freitas
 Josimar Melo
 Joyce Cavalccante
 Leandro Narloch
 Leilane Neubarth
 Leonardo Gagliano
 Lourival Fontes
 Lucius de Mello
 Luís Cristóvão dos Santos
 Manuel de Araújo Porto-alegre
 Márcia Mendes
 Mário Filho
 Maria Júlia Coutinho
 Mino Carta
 Monalisa Perrone
 Monteiro Lobato
 Narciso Vernizzi
 Nélson Rodrigues
 Palmério Dória
 Patrícia Poeta
 Paulo Francis
 Paulo Henrique Amorim
 Paulo Marques
 Perseu Abramo
 Poliana Abritta
 Rachel de Queiroz
 Rachel Sheherazade
 Reinaldo Azevedo
 Renata Vasconcellos
 Ricardo Boechat
 Ricardo Kotscho
 Rubem Braga
 Samuel Wainer
 Sandra Annenberg
 Sebastião Nery
 Sérgio Buarque de Holanda
 Sérgio de Souza
 Sud Mennucci
 Tariq Saleh
 Tim Lopes
 Vladimir Herzog
 William Bonner
 Zileide Silva
 Zuenir Ventura

Journalists
 
Brazilian